Miguel Borge Martín (born 30 October 1943 in Cozumel, Quintana Roo) is a Mexican politician member of the Institutional Revolutionary Party (PRI). 
Between 1987 and 1993 he served as governor of the state of Quintana Roo. Prior to his election as governor, he held a seat in the Senate, representing his home state.

His term in office was notable for the devastating landfall of Hurricane Gilbert on the Quintana Roo coast on 14 September 1988.

References 

1943 births
Politicians from Quintana Roo
Governors of Quintana Roo
Members of the Senate of the Republic (Mexico)
People from Cozumel
Living people
20th-century Mexican politicians
Institutional Revolutionary Party politicians